The 46th District of the Iowa House of Representatives in the state of Iowa.

Current elected officials
Ross Wilburn is the representative currently representing the district.

Past representatives
The district has previously been represented by:
 Joan Miller Lipsky, 1971–1973
 Jerome Fitzgerald, 1973–1979
 Rod Halvorson, 1979–1983
 Jean Hall Lloyd-Jones, 1983–1987
 Mary Neuhauser, 1987–1995
 Mary Mascher, 1995–2003
 Lisa Heddens, 2003–2019
 Ross Wilburn, 2019–present

References

046